707 Steina is a minor planet orbiting the Sun.

References

External links 
 
 

Background asteroids
Steina
Steina
Slow rotating minor planets
19101222